The American Samoa national rugby union team, also known as the "Talavalu",  represents American Samoa in international rugby union.

The Talavalu is the name of a traditional Samoan war weapon, originally carved out of ironwood. As can be seen on the right side of the American Samoa Rugby Union logo, it resembles a club but has eight diamond-shaped teeth carved on one edge. Translated, "tala" is teeth, and "valu" is eight.

History

National development of rugby union in American Samoa has been overshadowed by the popularity of American football since the 1970s. Unlike neighbouring Samoa, American Samoa has had limited international rugby competition. Most of American Samoa's matches have been played at the South Pacific Games.

American Samoa's first international 15's match was at the 1983 South Pacific Games in Apia, where they lost 55–0 to Western Samoa (as it was then called). They did not make the final stages of that tournament. American Samoa fared much better at the 1991 South Pacific Games in Port Moresby, notching up wins against Solomon Islands and French Polynesia. While they lost 34–7 to Western Samoa in the final, the American Samoans won the rugby 15's silver medal.

The South Pacific Games (now called the Pacific Games) subsequently switched to hosting rugby 7s in preference to rugby 15s, and the ASRU, while still eligible for the FORU Oceania Cup, turned more of its attention toward the seven-a-side form of the game. American Samoa competed at the Pacific Games Rugby 7s in 2011, and the Oceania Rugby 7s in 2011 and 2012.

In 2015 the Talavalu made their first appearance at the Oceania Rugby Cup. They won their first match against the Solomon Islands 30–15. In their second game, they lost to Papua New Guinea 36–22. Their third game against Tahiti was also a loss, 8–20. The Talavalu's finished the tournament in third place.

Diaspora
Due to limited opportunities at home, notable American Samoan players have been selected in other national teams instead of American Samoa.
American Samoans that have represented  include Mose Timoteo, Valenise Malifa, the Suniula brothers (Andrew, Roland and Shalom) and Junior Sifa.

Record

Overall

Recent Squad
Squad for the 2015 Oceania Rugby Cup:
Taeao Paaga 
Bogdaw Stewart Tuiletufuga
Esau Tufugafale 
Tavita Collins 
Maresala Jason Tagiilima Vaeau
Isaia Taylor 
Senio Petelo 
Jereme K. Sefuiva 
Johnny Vou 
Niki-Kata Lua 
Alesanalesili Suiaunoa 
Tauaniga Kepu 
Iopu Muliaga 
Shaun Tuiaana Salavea 
Peniata Toalepai 
Uatau Savelio Falanai 
Tiperio Finautele
Patrick Sio Talosaga 
Tino Tapuaialupe 
Tava'e Autagavaia 
Alefaio Alefaio
Melea Timo 
Gordon Setefano Moe 
Sonny Seti Lameta 
Faaleo Tevaga 
Lino Milo Tofailagi Iese

Management
Toma Akuino Leota (head coach)
Ropati Opa (assistant coach)
Taufaiula Mavaega (team manager)
Tommy Elisara (Assistant Manager)

See also
 American Samoa national rugby sevens team

Reference list

External links
 American Samoa on IRB.com

 
Nat
Oceanian national rugby union teams